Euskirchen is a Kreis (district) in the south-west of North Rhine-Westphalia, Germany. Neighboring districts are Aachen, Düren, Rhein-Erft-Kreis, Rhein-Sieg, Ahrweiler, Daun, Bitburg-Prüm, and the Liège province (Belgium).

History
In 1827 a first district around the city of Euskirchen was created, however much smaller than today. In 1932 the district of Rheinbach was dissolved, whereby the Euskirchen district gained its southern part. In 1972 the Euskirchen district grew again by the inclusion of the Schleiden district.

Geography
Geographically, the south-western half of the district is inside the Eifel hill chain. This land is hardly suitable for agriculture, and therefore in historical times the region was rather poor. Areas further to the north-east are more flat and have historically been used to grow a variety of crops, most notably sugar beets. The only other source of wealth was the iron ore, but today the many forests there make the area interesting for tourists.

Coat of arms
The coat of arms shows the four signs of the main historical territories or rulers of the district. Top-left are the roses of the counts of Arenberg, top-right the lion of Jülich, bottom-right the wave-line of the counts of Manderscheid-Blankenheim, and bottom-left the Cologne cross.
The coat of arms was granted in 1973.

Towns and municipalities

References

External links

Official Website (German)

 
Districts of North Rhine-Westphalia
States and territories established in 1827
1827 establishments in Prussia